Suzy Branning (originally known as Sue) is a fictional character from the BBC One soap opera EastEnders, played by Julie Christian-Young for a brief appearance in 1996, and Maggie O'Neill in 2008, who began filming in May that year, and she appeared from 8 July to 26 December 2008.

Storylines
Suzy first appears in 1996 for her  sister April's wedding to her fiancé Nikos (Yorgos Glastras), along with her children, Rebecca (Alice Dawnay) and Kevin (Jamie Dispirito). Nikos jilts April at the altar, so Suzy's other sister Carol Jackson (Lindsey Coulson) and her boyfriend Alan Jackson (Howard Antony) marry instead. After the wedding, Suzy is not heard of until October 2007, when it is revealed she is unable to attend her nephew Bradley Branning's (Charlie Clements) wedding to Stacey Slater (Lacey Turner). In July 2008, her brother Max Branning (Jake Wood) receives a series of calls from Suzy, asking for financial help. Max arranges for his friend Phil Mitchell (Steve McFadden) to take some money to Suzy at the salon she's looking after for a friend, Tantasy. Suzy presumes that Phil has been sent by her ex-partner, and knocks him out by hitting him around the head with a figurine. After some heavies turn up at the salon, Phil takes her to his home, The Queen Victoria public house, and she thanks him for saving her by sleeping with him. She later returns to see Phil, during Roxy Slater's (Rita Simons) wedding reception. Phil is delighted to see her, and they share a kiss. Phil says she can stay the night. Suzy meets Max, asking him if she can stay with him. She buries something in the allotments and the following day, Patrick Trueman (Rudolph Walker) accuses her of stealing the potatoes he was growing. She assures him she did not, despite looking suspicious.

Suzy takes the spare room at Dot Branning's (June Brown) house and looks after Tanya Branning's (Jo Joyner) salon while she is away. She later asks Phil to dig something up for her, revealed to be a bar of gold. Phil then moves in with Suzy, but his son Ben (Charlie Jones) takes a disliking to her. Phil cheats on Suzy with Shirley Carter (Linda Henry), which Suzy discovers. She tells Phil she is pregnant but it is a lie and she plans to con him out of his money to pay her ex-boyfriend Ahmet (Tamer Hassan). Phil proposes to Suzy who accepts. Shirley and her friend Heather Trott (Cheryl Fergison) discover that Suzy is still buying tampons and realise she is not pregnant. She lies to Phil that she had a miscarriage. When she reveals that she lied to Phil, they break up. However, Archie Mitchell (Larry Lamb) uses Suzy to plant DNA results in a Christmas cracker, showing that Sean Slater (Robert Kazinsky) is not the father of Roxy's baby. Suzy leaves after insulting the entire Mitchell family, before Sean finds the results. Phil discovers that £10,000 is missing and blames Suzy so he and Shirley go to find her. In the Queen Victoria, Shirley trips Suzy and she is knocked out. Shirley takes the money back and when Suzy comes around, she burns it, telling Suzy to get out. Suzy then leaves Walford.

Suzy writes to Phil's mother Peggy (Barbara Windsor) a few months later on a postcard from Dubai telling her she didn't need Archie's money after all, but after being found by Danielle Jones (Lauren Crace), Archie is able to dispose of it before Peggy receives it. Following her father Jim’s (John Bardon) death in 2015, Max declared during his eulogy that his sisters hated Jim so much they did not make any effort to attend his funeral. Max leaves the Square in early 2018 in order to stay with Suzy following the death of his daughter Abi Branning (Lorna Fitzgerald).

Creation and development
The character, then referred to as Sue, was seen at the wedding of her sister, April (Debbie Arnold) in 1996, appearing in two episodes, played by Julie Christian-Young. On 23 April 2008, it was announced Suzy will be returning to EastEnders. Maggie O'Neill was cast in the role, taking over from Julie Christian-Young. Suzy was re-introduced as a love interest for established character Phil Mitchell (Steve McFadden) and makes a strong love rival of Shirley Carter (Linda Henry). Of her casting, O'Neill commented: "The Brannings are a great family and I am really excited to become one of them. Suzy is a woman to be reckoned with and I'm looking forward to playing her." Diederick Santer added: "I've long-admired Maggie's work from her outstanding performance in Take Me Home to her hilarious and moving Sheila in Shameless. She's yet another top drawer addition to our wonderful cast." O’Neill made her first appearance as Suzy on 8 July 2008. In an interview with Digital Spy, Santer said that viewers will soon notice that Suzy Branning is never far from her large pink handbag and viewers will always be unsure of its contents.

See also
List of EastEnders characters (1996)

References

External links

EastEnders characters
Fictional criminals in soap operas
Fictional con artists
Fictional bartenders
Fictional beauticians
Television characters introduced in 1996
Female villains
Female characters in television
Fictional blackmailers
Branning family